Leon Toohey (2 November 1934 – 4 July 2000) was an  Australian rules footballer who played with Hawthorn in the Victorian Football League (VFL).

Notes

External links 

1934 births
2000 deaths
Australian rules footballers from Victoria (Australia)
Hawthorn Football Club players